This is a list of the bird species recorded of French Southern and Antarctic Lands. The avifauna of French Southern and Antarctic Lands include a total of 87 species. 

This list's taxonomic treatment (designation and sequence of orders, families and species) and nomenclature (common and scientific names) follow the conventions of The Clements Checklist of Birds of the World, 2022 edition. The family accounts at the beginning of each heading reflect this taxonomy, as do the species counts found in each family account. Introduced and accidental species are included in the total counts for French Southern and Antarctic Lands.

The following tags have been used to highlight several categories. The commonly occurring native species do not fall into any of these categories.

(A) Accidental - a species that rarely or accidentally occurs in French Southern and Antarctic Lands.

Ducks, geese, and waterfowl
Order: AnseriformesFamily: Anatidae

Anatidae includes the ducks and most duck-like waterfowl, such as geese and swans. These birds are adapted to an aquatic existence with webbed feet, flattened bills, and feathers that are excellent at shedding water due to an oily coating.

Amsterdam duck, Mareca marecula (E) extinct
Eaton's pintail, Anas georgica (E)

Cuckoos
Order: CuculiformesFamily: Cuculidae

The family Cuculidae includes uckoos, roadrunners, and anis. These birds are of variable size with slender bodies, long tails, and strong legs. The Old World cuckoos are brood parasites.

Common cuckoo, Cuculus canorus (A)

Sheathbills
Order: CharadriiformesFamily: Chionididae
The sheathbills are scavengers of the Antarctic regions. They have white plumage and look plump and dove-like but are believed to be similar to the ancestors of the modern gulls and terns.

Black-faced sheathbill, Chionis minor

Plovers and lapwings
Order: CharadriiformesFamily: Charadriidae

The family Charadriidae includes the plovers, dotterels, and lapwings. They are small to medium-sized birds with compact bodies, short thick necks, and long, usually pointed, wings. They are found in open country worldwide, mostly in habitats near water.

Blacksmith lapwing, Vanellus armatus (A)

Sandpipers and allies
Order: CharadriiformesFamily: Scolopacidae

Scolopacidae is a large diverse family of small to medium-sized shorebirds including the sandpipers, curlews, godwits, shanks, tattlers, woodcocks, snipes, dowitchers and phalaropes. The majority of these species eat small invertebrates picked out of the mud or soil. Variation in length of legs and bills enables multiple species to feed in the same habitat, particularly on the coast, without direct competition for food.

Whimbrel, Numenius phaeopus 
Bar-tailed godwit, Limosa lapponica 
Ruddy turnstone, Arenaria interpres
Red knot, Calidris canutus 
Curlew sandpiper, Calidris ferruginea 
Sanderling, Calidris alba Common sandpiper, Actitis hypoleucos 
Gray-tailed tattler, Tringa brevipes 
Common greenshank, Tringa nebulariaPratincoles and coursers
Order: CharadriiformesFamily: Glareolidae

Glareolidae is a family of wading birds comprising the pratincoles, which have short legs, long pointed wings, and long forked tails, and the coursers, which have long legs, short wings, and long, pointed bills which curve downwards.

Black-winged pratincole, Glareola nordmanni (A)

Skuas and jaegers
Order: CharadriiformesFamily: Stercorariidae

The family Stercorariidae are, in general, medium to large birds, typically with grey or brown plumage, often with white markings on the wings. They nest on the ground in temperate and arctic regions and are long-distance migrants.

Chilean skua, Stercorarius chilensis (A)
South polar skua, Stercorarius maccormicki 
Brown skua, Stercorarius antarcticaLong-tailed jaeger, Stercorarius longicaudus (A) 

Gulls, terns, and skimmers
Order: CharadriiformesFamily: Laridae

Laridae is a family of medium to large seabirds, the gulls, terns, and skimmers. Gulls are typically grey or white, often with black markings on the head or wings. They have stout, longish bills and webbed feet. Terns are a group of generally medium to large seabirds typically with grey or white plumage, often with black markings on the head. Most terns hunt fish by diving but some pick insects off the surface of fresh water. Terns are generally long-lived birds, with several species known to live in excess of 30 years.

Kelp gull, Larus dominicanus 
Sooty tern, Onychoprion fuscatusArctic tern, Sterna paradisaeaAntarctic tern, Sterna vittataKerguelen tern, Sterna virgataPenguins
Order: SphenisciformesFamily: Spheniscidae

The penguins are a group of aquatic, flightless birds living almost exclusively in the Southern Hemisphere. Most penguins feed on krill, fish, squid and other forms of sealife caught while swimming underwater.

King penguin, Aptenodytes patagonicus 
Emperor penguin, Aptenodytes forsteri  
Adelie penguin, Pygoscelis adeliaeGentoo penguin, Pygoscelis papuaChinstrap penguin, Pygoscelis antarcticaMacaroni penguin, Eudyptes chrysolophusRoyal penguin, Eudyptes schlegeli (A)
Southern rockhopper penguin, Eudyptes chrysocome 
Moseley's rockhopper penguin, Eudyptes moseleyi 

Albatrosses
Order: ProcellariiformesFamily: Diomedeidae

The albatrosses are among the largest of flying birds, and the great albatrosses from the genus Diomedea have the largest wingspans of any extant birds.

Yellow-nosed albatross, Thalassarche chlororhynchos 
Gray-headed albatross, Thalassarche chrysostoma 
White-capped albatross, Thalassarche cautaSalvin's albatross, Thalassarche salviniBlack-browed albatross, Thalassarche melanophrisSooty albatross, Phoebetria fusca 
Light-mantled albatross, Phoebetria palpebrataRoyal albatross, Diomedea epomophora 
Wandering albatross, Diomedea exulansSouthern storm-petrels
Order: ProcellariiformesFamily: Oceanitidae

The southern storm-petrels are relatives of the petrels and are the smallest seabirds. They feed on planktonic crustaceans and small fish picked from the surface, typically while hovering. The flight is fluttering and sometimes bat-like.

Wilson's storm-petrel, Oceanites oceanicusGray-backed storm-petrel, Garrodia nereis 
White-faced storm-petrel, Pelagodroma marina (Ex)
White-bellied storm-petrel, Fregetta grallaria 
Black-bellied storm-petrel, Fregetta tropica 

Shearwaters and petrels
Order: ProcellariiformesFamily: Procellariidae

The procellariids are the main group of medium-sized "true petrels", characterised by united nostrils with medium septum and a long outer functional primary.

Southern giant-petrel, Macronectes giganteusNorthern giant-petrel, Macronectes halliSouthern fulmar, Fulmarus glacialoides (A)
Antarctic petrel, Thalassoica antarctica (A)
Cape petrel, Daption capense 
Snow petrel, Pagodroma niveaKerguelen petrel, Aphrodroma brevirostrisGreat-winged petrel, Pterodroma macroptera 
Soft-plumaged petrel, Pterodroma mollisBarau's petrel, Pterodroma baraui (A)
White-headed petrel, Pterodroma lessoniiJuan Fernandez petrel, Pterodroma externa (A)
Blue petrel, Halobaena caeruleaFairy prion, Pachyptila turturBroad-billed prion, Pachyptila vittataSalvin's prion, Pachyptila salviniMacGillivray's prion, Pachyptila macgillivrayi (Extirpated)
Antarctic prion, Pachyptila desolataSlender-billed prion, Pachyptila belcheriFulmar prion, Pachyptila crassirostrisGray petrel, Procellaria cinereaWhite-chinned petrel, Procellaria aequinoctialisCory's shearwater, Calonectris diomedeaFlesh-footed shearwater, Ardenna carneipesGreat shearwater, Ardenna gravis (A)
Sooty shearwater, Ardenna grisea 
Rapa shearwater, Puffinus myrtaeLittle shearwater, Puffinus assimilis 
Subantarctic shearwater, Puffinus elegansTropical shearwater, Puffinus bailloniCommon diving-petrel, Pelecanoides urinatrixSouth Georgia diving-petrel, Pelecanoides georgicusBoobies and gannets
Order: SuliformesFamily: Sulidae

The sulids comprise the gannets and boobies. Both groups are medium-large coastal seabirds that plunge-dive for fish.

Cape gannet, Morus capensis (A)
Australasian gannet, Morus serratorCormorants and shags
Order: SuliformesFamily: Phalacrocoracidae

Phalacrocoracidae is a family of medium to large coastal, fish-eating seabirds that includes cormorants and shags. Plumage colouration varies, with the majority having mainly dark plumage, some species being black-and-white and a few being colourful.

Imperial cormorant, Leucocarbo atricepsCrozet shag, Leucocarbo melanogenisKerguelen shag, Leucocarbo verrucosus (E)

Herons, egrets, and bitterns
Order: PelecaniformesFamily: Ardeidae

The family Ardeidae contains the bitterns, herons and egrets. Herons and egrets are medium to large wading birds with long necks and legs. Bitterns tend to be shorter necked and more wary. Members of Ardeidae fly with their necks retracted, unlike other long-necked birds such as storks, ibises and spoonbills.

Black-crowned night-heron, Nycticorax nycticoraxFalcons and caracaras
Order: FalconiformesFamily: Falconidae

Falconidae is a family of diurnal birds of prey. They differ from hawks, eagles, and kites in that they kill with their beaks instead of their talons.

Eleonora's falcon, Falco eleonoraeWaxbills, munias, and allies
Order: PasseriformesFamily: Estrildidae

The members of this family are small passerine birds native to the Old World tropics. They are gregarious and often colonial seed eaters with short thick but pointed bills. They are all similar in structure and habits, but have wide variation in plumage colors and patterns.

Common waxbill, Estrilda astrild'' (I)

See also
List of birds
Lists of birds by region

References

French Southern and Antarctic Lands